At the end of each ICC Cricket World Cup final tournament, several awards are presented to the players and teams which have distinguished themselves in various aspects of the game.

Awards summary
There are currently four post-tournament awards:

the Golden Bat Award (currently termed "ICC Golden Bat") for top run scorer, first awarded in 1975;
the Golden Ball Award (currently termed "ICC Golden Ball") for top wicket getter, first awarded in 1975;
the Player of the tournament Award (currently termed "ICC Player of the tournament") for outstanding performance in the entire World Cup tournament, first awarded in 1992;
the Player of the match in Final Award (currently termed "ICC Player of the match in Final") for outstanding player in World Cup finals, first awarded in 1992;

Player of the tournament

Player of the match in Final

Golden Bat
The Golden Bat Award goes to the top run scorer of the ICC World Cup. While every World Cup had a ranking of the run scorers, the first time an award was given was in 1975. If there is more than one player with the same number of runs both of them are awarded with the Golden Bat. India is the only country whose players have won the Golden Bat a record 4 times (Sachin Tendulkar in 1996 & 2003, Rahul Dravid in 1999,  and Rohit Sharma in 2019).

Golden Ball
The Golden Ball Award goes to the top wicket taker of the ICC World Cup. While every World Cup had a ranking of the wicket takers, the first time an award was given was in 1975.

If there is more than one player with the same number of wickets both of them are awarded with the Golden Ball.

History
For a long period of time prior to the Cricket World Cup, awards were handed out to players for their performance in each match. These player's were named the Man of the Match. This trend continued into the Cricket World Cup. To receive a Man of the Match award in the final generally meant that one had put up a match-winning performance for their team and, in essence, won their team the World Cup.

Since 1992, at the end of the World Cup, one player is declared as "Man of the Tournament".

1975 Cricket World Cup
Man of the Final Match
1975 –  Clive Lloyd – 102 runs from 85 balls

The 1975 Cricket World Cup was the first World Cup. The final was between the Australian cricket team and the West Indies cricket team. The West Indies were sent in to bat by the Australian captain Ian Chappell and slumped to 3/50 leaving Rohan Kanhai and captain Clive Lloyd at the crease. The pair combined for a partnership of 149 runs for the 4th wicket and brought the West Indies back into the match. Clive Lloyd top scored, with 102 runs coming off just 85 balls. When Lloyd fell the West Indies were 4/199. A lower order batting collapse took the West Indies to 6/209 before the tailenders combined to achieve the total of 291.

The Australians began their chase on track, with brothers Greg Chappell and Ian Chappell taking them to 2/115. However, the Australian innings collapsed when Lloyd ran out Ian Chappell and subsequently took the wicket of Walters. Australia took their score to 274 all out and West Indies won the match. Fittingly, captain Clive Lloyd was named Man of the Match.

1979 Cricket World Cup
Man of the Final Match
1979 –  Viv Richards

In the 1979 Cricket World Cup, the West Indies were once again in the final, this time against England. England won the toss and sent the West Indies in to bat. The West Indies dropped to 3/55 and later 4/99 before Viv Richards and Collis King combined for a 139 run partnership before King was dismissed for 86. Richards remained and continued to score with the tail, who were all dismissed for ducks. Richards remained on 138 not out and the West Indies ended on 9/286.

Richards bowled 10 overs economically and ended with figures of 0/35 as England began a slow and steady chase to the West Indies' target. However, the English team inexplicably collapsed from 2/183 to 194 all out to give the West Indies the world cup for the second time in a row. Viv Richards was named man of the match.

1983 Cricket World Cup
Man of the Final Match
1983 –  Mohinder Amarnath – 3/12 and 26

The 1983 Cricket World Cup Final was on a pitch considered very difficult to bat on. The final was between the Indian cricket team and the West Indies. With the West Indies sending India in to bat. India's star batsman Sunil Gavaskar was out early in the innings as India fell to 1 wicket for 2 runs as Mohinder Amarnath came in to bat with Kris Srikkanth. The two managed to combine to form a gritty partnership which ended at 2/59 when Srikkanth fell. Amarnath still remained and took India to 2/90 before losing his wicket. He scored 26 off 80 balls. India were all out for 183, with only three batsmen, one of them Amarnath, crossing the 20-mark.

The West Indies began in similar fashion but a top-order collapse saw them fall to 6/76 through the bowling of Madan Lal and Kapil Dev. However, from there on the pair of Jeff Dujon and Malcolm Marshall combined to take the West Indies past the 100 mark. However, Amarnath came in to bowl and took both of their wickets, leaving the West Indies at 8/124, before he trapped Michael Holding leg before wicket to take India to a 43 run victory. Amarnath had innings-best figures of 3/12 and he was commended for his all-round performance with the Man of the Match award. It is the lowest World Cup final score to be defended.

1987 Cricket World Cup
Man of the Final Match
1987 –  David Boon – 75 runs

The 1987 Cricket World Cup Final was between England and Australia. Australia won the toss and elected to bat, sending in openers David Boon and Geoff Marsh. Australia got off to a very good start thanks to Boon's batting. Boon was part of a 75 run stand with Marsh and a 76 run stand with Dean Jones and took Australia to 1/150. Boon was out for 75 with Australia at 4/168 before Border and Veletta took Australia to 253 in the 50 overs. Boon was the only batsman to cross 50.

In the second innings, England ended at 246 with various Australian bowlers, namely Craig McDermott, Steve Waugh, Simon O'Donnell and Allan Border, sharing the wickets. Boon participated in the run out of John Emburey when England were 5/218. Australia won the World Cup and Boon was named Man of the Match.

1992 Cricket World Cup
Man of the Tournament
1992 –  Martin Crowe – 456 runs

New Zealand batsman and captain Martin Crowe began the 1992 Cricket World Cup in Australia and New Zealand with a strong 100 not out against Australia. In the next two innings he scored only 5 and 3 respectively, but came back with 74 not out against Zimbabwe and 81 not out against the West Indies. In the remaining group matches, he scored 24, 73 not out and 3 as New Zealand progressed to the Semi-Finals. In the Semi-Final match against Pakistan, Crowe top-scored with 91 off just 83 balls, taking New Zealand from 2/39 to 6/221 as they ended on 7/262. However, it wasn't enough as Pakistan won with one over to spare. Pakistan went on to win the World Cup but Crowe was awarded the first Man of the Tournament because of his exceptional batting performances. He averaged 114.00 and had scored 1 century and 3 fifties.

Man of the Final Match
1992 –  Wasim Akram – 33 runs off 19 balls and 3 wickets

The 1992 Cricket World Cup Final was between Pakistan and England. Pakistan elected to bat first. After the openers failed to make an impact, Javed Miandad and Imran Khan carried the Pakistani innings through to 4/197, when Inzamam-ul-Haq was joined by Wasim Akram at the crease. Inzamam-ul-Haq hit 42 off 35 balls while Akram hit 33 off 19 balls before being run out on the last ball of the innings, taking Pakistan to 6/249 in 50 overs.

England's innings started badly when Akram dismissed Ian Botham for 0. England drooped to 4/69 before some resistance was provided by Allan Lamb and Neil Fairbrother, who took England to 4/141 and within the hope of achieving the target. However, at this point Akram returned to the attack and dismissed Lamb for 31 and the next batsman, Lewis, for 0. England did not recover and was all out for 227. Akram finished with 3/49, his all-round performance earned him Man of the Match.

1996 Cricket World Cup
Man of the Tournament
1996 –  Sanath Jayasuriya – 221 runs (strike rate of 132) and 7 wickets

Batsman Sanath Jayasuriya played in 6 matches in the 1996 Cricket World Cup, of which Sri Lanka won them all. After a score of just 6 against Zimbabwe. Jayasuriya performed better against India, helping Sri Lanka to victory with 79 off 76 balls. He went on to score 44 runs against Kenya and 82 against England. In the semi-final against India, Jayasuriya was out for 1 but contributed with the ball taking the wickets of Sachin Tendulkar, Sanjay Manjrekar and Ajay Jadeja. His wickets triggered a collapse which reduced India from 1/98 to 8/120 and took Sri Lanka to the final. Jayasuriya did not perform in the final, he scored just 9 and got 1/43 with the ball.

Although other batsmen, including Sachin Tendulkar who scored a record 523 runs at an average of 87.16, scored more runs than him. Jayasuriya was awarded Man of the Tournament for his aggressive and exciting strokeplay and his match-winning qualities.

Man of the Final Match
1996 –  Aravinda de Silva – 107 not out and 3/42

The 1996 Cricket World Cup Final was between Australia and Sri Lanka. Sri Lanka won the toss and sent in Australia to bat. Australia reached 1/137 in the 27th over with Mark Taylor and Ricky Ponting dominating proceedings. De Silva then came in to bowl and dismissed both Taylor and Ponting, falling to 4/156 before Stuart Law and Steve Waugh stabilized the innings. When they both fell, Australia was at 6/202 with Ian Healy and Michael Bevan at the crease, De Silva bowled out Healy but Bevan persisted, taking Australia to 241/7.

Australia was forced to bowl in the foggy dew, but still shortened Sri Lanka's chances with quick dismissals of the openers, as Sri Lanka slumped to 2/23. Then De Silva came into the crease and played "on the biggest occasion of his life, played with quite wonderful
judgment". He scored 107 from 124 balls, only the 3rd ever century in the World Cup final, and partnered with Asanka Gurusinha and Arjuna Ranatunga, to take Sri Lanka to what ended up an easy victory. De Silva was awarded the well-deserved Man of the Match.

1999 Cricket World Cup
Man of the Tournament
1999 –  Lance Klusener – 281 runs (strike rate of 122) and 17 wickets

The all-rounder Lance Klusener was part of the South African team in a time in which it was very successful in One Day International cricket. He played 9 matches in the World Cup and almost made it 10 with his final overs cameo against Australia in the semi-final that went in vain as the match was tied. Klusener averaged 140.5 with the bat and 20.58 with the ball in this World Cup.

Klusener opened his World Cup with a win against India in which he took 3/66 and made 12 not out. He continued his form in subsequent matches, scoring 52* and 3/21 against Sri Lanka, 48* and 1/16 against England, 5/21 against Kenya, 52* and 1/36 in a losing cause against Zimbabwe to carry South Africa through to the Super Sixes stage. In the Super Sixes, Klusener failed with the bat for the first time in the Cup, scoring only 4 against New Zealand, but he still took 2/46 with the ball. He scored 46* and took 1/41 against Pakistan and scored 36 and 1/53 against Australia in another losing cause. In the World Cup semi-final, Klusener came in when the score was 6/175, with the South Africans required 39 in 5 overs to win. Klusener scored 31 off just 16 balls and brought South Africa to the level of a tie, but then a run out with Allan Donald resulted in the match remaining tied and Australia passed through to the final per past results with Klusener remaining stranded not out.

Klusener had a strike rate of 122, indicative of his quick-paced batting, but his average was higher than even his strike rate. While Rahul Dravid was the leading run-scorer (461) and Shane Warne was the leading wicket-taker (20). His all-around performance earned him the man of the series award.

Man of the Final Match
1999 –  Shane Warne – 4/33

The 1999 Cricket World Cup Final was between Australia and Pakistan. Pakistan won the toss and elected to bat first. The openers were out early as Pakistan got to 3/68 at the 20th over. Australian leg spin bowler Shane Warne was brought into the attack and made impact, bowling out Ijaz Ahmed for 22 and having Moin Khan caught behind for 6, reducing Pakistan to 5/91 after 27 overs. Pakistan attempted to rebuild their innings through their long line of all-rounders, but Warne and Paul Reiffel eliminated the threat. Warne got the wickets of captain Wasim Akram and dangerous all-rounder Shahid Afridi. Pakistan was all out for 132 and Warne ended with 4/33.

The target was of no concern to the Australia team, winning by 8 wickets with 29.5 overs in hand, with Adam Gilchrist top scoring with 54. Warne was awarded Man of the Match for his match-winning bowling performance.

2003 Cricket World Cup
Man of the Tournament
2003 –  Sachin Tendulkar – 673 runs and 2 wickets

India was quite successful in the 2003 Cricket World Cup. Apart from making it to the final, they only lost two matches, both to champions Australia. One of the major reasons for this success was the record-breaking performance of "Little Master" Sachin Tendulkar. In 11 innings Tendulkar scored 673 runs at an average of 61.18. He started off his World Cup campaign with a 52 against the Netherlands and a gritty 36 against Australia while all else was collapsing. From that point on in the World Cup, he scored consistently. After an 81 and 152 against Zimbabwe and Namibia respectively, he scored 50 against England and 98 against Pakistan in what was the highest successful run chase in the whole World Cup. He failed to perform against New Zealand and Kenya in the Super Sixes, but scored 97 against Sri Lanka to seal a 180 run victory. He came back in the semi-final against Kenya to score 83. However, in the final, he did not perform, scoring only 4 against a mammoth Australia target.

Out of his 11 innings, Tendulkar was unlucky to only get 1 century. He reached 98 against Pakistan and 97 against Sri Lanka before being dismissed. He also reached the 80s twice. In his 11 World Cup innings, Tendulkar scored 7 50+ scores. Tendulkar remains the record-holder of numerous records in World Cups.

Man of the Final Match
2003 –  Ricky Ponting – 140 not out

The final of the 2003 Cricket World Cup was between India and Australia. India won the toss and sent Australia in to bat. The Australian openers wreaked havoc on the Indian pace bowlers and only Harbhajan Singh could take wickets. In the 14th over, Adam Gilchrist was dismissed by Singh and Ricky Ponting walked in to bat. Australia was 2–125 in the 20th over when Ponting was joined by Damien Martyn at the crease. Australia achieved 200 in just 35 overs. Martyn and Ponting held a 100 run partnership off just 109 balls. Australia achieved the highest partnership for this ground in ODIs. In the 41st over Australia achieved 250. Ponting then reached his century which included 5 sixes and Australia quickened the pace, scoring 110 runs in the next nine overs at 12.2 runs per over. Ponting scored 140, the highest in a World Cup final at the time and Martyn scored 88, his highest against India.

India's start was not so dominating, Sachin Tendulkar being dismissed for just 4. India fell to 3/59 before Rahul Dravid and Virender Sehwag combined to take the total to 3/147. India reached 234 before they were all out in the 38th over. Ponting, Australia's captain, was awarded Man of the Match.

2007 Cricket World Cup
Man of the Tournament
2007 –  Glenn McGrath – 26 wickets

Man of the Final Match 2007 –  Adam Gilchrist – 149 runs

2011 Cricket World Cup
Man of the Tournament
2011 –  Yuvraj Singh – 362 Runs and 15 wickets
Yuvraj Singh of India had a great tournament. Even though he had a golf ball sized tumour around his lungs (that was later diagnosed as cancer) he played his heart out and very significantly helped win India the World Cup. He performed well with both bat and ball in almost all games he played in. He scored a half-century against England and The Netherlands. He impressed with the ball by picking up a 5 for against Ireland, whilst also scoring a half-century. His greatest contribution came against the West Indies, where he scored a hundred on a tough pitch and also picked up 2 wickets, helping India to reach the knockout stages. In the quarterfinals, he played a vital knock against Australia, scoring another half century and picking up 2 wickets. Though he failed to score in the semi-final against Pakistan, he replied with the ball, picking up the important wickets of Asad Shafiq and the experienced Younis Khan. In the final against Sri Lanka, he once again proved his allrounder capabilities, picking up 2 important wickets and providing a winning partnership with MS Dhoni to take India home to a historic win. He scored a total of 362 runs and picked up 15 wickets in the tournament.

Man of the final match of 2011 Cricket World Cup:  M S Dhoni
Man of the Final Match 2011 –  Mahendra Singh Dhoni with 91 (79) runs.

Sri Lanka started the innings slowly, constrained by good bowling from Zaheer Khan and committed fielding from Yuvraj Singh, Suresh Raina, and Virat Kohli inside the 30-yard circle. Zaheer began with three consecutive maidens and the wicket of Upul Tharanga, conceding only six runs in his five-over spell. Sri Lankan opener Tillakaratne Dilshan was bowled by Harbhajan Singh when a delivery carried on to the stumps after deflecting off his gloves. Captain Kumar Sangakkara came in after Tharanga's dismissal, and was building a solid foundation with Dilshan before the latter was dismissed. Mahela Jayawardene came to the crease when Sri Lanka were 60/2 in the 17th over. Sangakkara and Mahela went about the task of consolidating the innings, but eventually Sangakkara was caught behind by Dhoni at 48. New batsman Thilan Samaraweera was adjudged not out by the umpire when a ball hit his thigh pad off the bowling of Yuvraj Singh. The Indians decided to review the decision and he was ultimately given out. Chamara Kapugedera, who was playing his first World Cup match, was caught off a deceptive slower ball by Zaheer Khan. Jayawardene, meanwhile, continued with his quality batting, ultimately scoring 103 not out from 88 balls in a high-class batting display. Helped by the hard-hitting of Nuwan Kulasekara and Thisara Perera, Sri Lanka scored 91 runs in the last 10 overs, including 63 in the batting powerplay (45–50 overs) to take the score to 274/6

India had a shaky start, with Virender Sehwag and Sachin Tendulkar both dismissed early by Lasith Malinga, leaving them struggling at 31 for two. Sehwag was trapped LBW for a duck on the second ball of the innings. Tendulkar started with some good strokes, racing to 18 off 14 balls, but then edged a catch to wicketkeeper Sangakkara. Virat Kohli and Gautam Gambhir started the recovery with some fluent stroke play and quick running between wickets, taking India to 114 before Kohli was caught-and-bowled by Tillakaratne Dilshan for 35. When he was on 30, Gambhir mistimed a shot off the bowling of Suraj Randiv, sending the ball high up in the air, but Nuwan Kulasekara could not hold on to a difficult chance at long off. Kohli and Gambhir put together an 83-run partnership before Kohli's dismissal. Dhoni came in after Kohli to bat at number five, usually the position of Yuvraj Singh. Both Kohli and Dhoni are right-handed batsmen, while Gambhir and Yuvraj are left-handed. Along with other considerations, by coming ahead of Yuvraj, Dhoni ensured there would be a right-left batting combination between him and Gambhir, which makes it difficult for the bowlers to get into a rhythm, and necessitates frequent field changes. Both Gambhir and Dhoni emphasised on preserving the wickets, and later accelerating with a greater flow of boundaries. Gambhir and Dhoni added 109 for the fourth wicket with Gambhir scoring 97. Gambhir tried to finish his century with a boundary, but his heaving bat failed to connect with the ball, and he was bowled by Thisara Perera. Following Gambhir's dismissal, 52 runs were required off 52 balls. Yuvraj Singh was the new batsman and along with Dhoni took India to victory, and Dhoni sealed the match hitting a six off Nuwan Kulasekara, when only 4 runs were required off 11 balls. Dhoni finished on 91 not out from 79 deliveries. Like in many other day-night matches in the subcontinent, dew started to form on the outfield grass in the night, making the ball damp and difficult to grip especially in the later part of India's batting. However, this was a known factor and was taken into consideration by the Sri Lankan captain when he chose to bat first after winning the toss. By crossing the target of 274, India had set a record for the highest successful run-chase in a World Cup final.

At the end of the match, the batting strength of both the teams stood out. The three top run scorers of this tournament were from these finalists: Tillekaratne Dilshan (500 runs), Sachin Tendulkar (482), and Kumar Sangakkara (465). In the top 10 tournament scorers, there were three from Sri Lanka (Upul Tharanga (395) in addition to the previous two), and four from India (Gautam Gambhir (393), Virender Sehwag (380), and Yuvraj Singh (362) in addition to Sachin).

2015 Cricket World Cup
Man of the Tournament
2015 –  Mitchell Starc – 22 wickets

The Australian fast bowler was notable for his yorkers and wicket-taking deliveries in the World Cup. He started the World Cup by taking 2 wickets against England in the opening match. The highlights of the tournament of Starc was when made a big turnaround in the group match against New Zealand when took 6 wickets and four of them were bowled. Unfortunately, New Zealand won the game by 1 wicket. His form in the World Cup continued by taking wickets against Afghanistan, Sri Lanka and against Scotland where he took 4 wickets and was awarded the man of the match. In the knockout stages he took 2 wickets against Pakistan and 2 against India to take Australia to the final. He was very supportive by his fellow bowlers James Faulkner, Josh Hazlewood, Mitchell Johnson. In the final Australia took on New Zealand at MCG where Australia started as favourites. In the first over of the final, New Zealand Captain Brendon McCullum was bowled for 0 by Mitchell Starc. It was the big moment of the final. Australia then went on to win the match by 7 wickets to become 5-time world champions. Starc was named as the player of the tournament for his outstanding bowling, yorkers and wicket-taking deliveries. He finished with 22 wickets and joint highest with Trent Boult for the most wickets at 2015 world cup.

Man of the Match of the Final
2015–  James Faulkner – 3 wickets conceiving 36 runs in 9 overs

2019 Cricket World Cup 
Man of the Tournament
2019–  Kane Williamson – 578 runs and 2 wickets (for his captainship as well)

Man of the Match of the Final
2019–  Ben Stokes – 84* runs and 8* runs in Super Over

See also
Cricket World Cup records
History of the Cricket World Cup

References

Awards